Igala or IGALA may refer to:

 IGALA, the International Gender and Language Association, an interdisciplinary academic organization
 Igala Kingdom, a pre-colonial West African state
 Igala language, a Volta–Niger language
 Igala people, an ethnic group in Nigeria
 Igala Union, a former political party in Nigeria 
 Volkswagen Igala, a compact car marketed in Nigeria, 1976–1980

Language and nationality disambiguation pages